Croxden is a civil parish in the district of East Staffordshire, Staffordshire, England.  It contains 21 listed buildings that are recorded in the National Heritage List for England.  Of these, one is listed at Grade I, the highest of the three grades, and the others are at Grade II, the lowest grade.    The parish includes villages including Croxden, Combridge, and Hollington, and is otherwise rural.  The most important building in the parish is Croxden Abbey, which is listed at Grade I and is also a scheduled monument.  Most of the other listed buildings are houses and associated structures, cottages, farmhouses and farm buildings.  The rest of the listed buildings include a church, memorials in the churchyard, a school, a bridge, and a milepost.


Key

Buildings

References

Citations

Sources

Lists of listed buildings in Staffordshire